Sidi Rached is a town and commune in Tipaza Province in northern Algeria.

References

Communes of Tipaza Province
Cities in Algeria
Algeria